Snortin' Whiskey (also sometimes referred to as "Snortin' Whiskey, Drinkin' Cocaine") is a blues rock song written by Pat Travers and Pat Thrall. It was originally recorded by the Pat Travers Band and released on the album Crash and Burn in 1980 on the Polydor label and also as US single the same year.

Background
The song was an instant hit, and reached the number one position on request lists at numerous FM radio stations in the United States in 1980. It gained popularity in the United Kingdom and Germany as well. It became one of Pat Travers' signature songs. The success of "Snortin' Whiskey" helped to propel the Crash and Burn album to the number 20 position on the Billboard Magazine's Pop Album Chart, making it Travers' highest-charting release.

Personnel
Musicians who performed on the original studio recording of "Snortin' Whiskey" were:
Pat Travers - lead vocals, lead and rhythm guitars (second guitar solo during lead break)
Pat Thrall - lead and rhythm guitars (first guitar solo during lead break)
Peter "Mars" Cowling - bass
Tommy Aldridge - drums and percussion (including cowbell)

Popular culture
The song was featured in the 2004 film Sideways.

References

1980 singles
Drinking songs
Songs about drugs
1980 songs
Polydor Records singles